Moti BA or Motilal Upadhyay (1 Aug 1919 - 18 Jan 2009)  was a Bhojpuri poet, writer and lyricist. He has written many Bhojpuri poems, novels and lyrics of Bhojiwood and Bollywood films. For his works in Bhojpuri he received Bhasha Samman Award in 2001. He has written many songs and translated many  English works in Bhojpuri.

Life

Moti BA was born in Bereji village near Deoria district of Uttar Pradesh in India. He completed his school education from King George high school in 1934. He completed his bachelor in Arts from Benaras Hindu University in 1938.

Career

From 1939 to 1943 he worked in Editorial department of newspapers like Aaj, Agragami and Sansar aur Aryavart. He became famous as lyricist and musician between 1944 to 1952, he worked for Motiji Pancholi Art Pictures and Filmistan. In 1952 he started working as lecturer at Shri Krishna Inter College in Deoria. He wrote many famous songs as a lyricist, specially his song in the movie Nadiya ke paar. In 1952 he became the professor of Shree Krishna Inter college, Barhaj in Deoria district.

Bibliography

Bhojpuri

Semar ke Phul

 Tulsi Rasayan
Moti Ke Muktak
Mahuabari
Ban Ban Bole Koyalia
Kavi Manav Sadhna

Translations in Bhojpuri 
 Abraham Lincoln (from English, written by John Drinkwater)

Awards and recognition

 Bhasha Samman Award in 2001 in Bhojpuri Language.

References

1919 births
2009 deaths
People from Deoria district
Poets from Uttar Pradesh
Bhojpuri-language writers